Abudramae Bamba (born 26 October 1987 in Abidjan) is an Ivorian footballer. He plays in the centre forward position.

Career
After spending the first six years of his career in his home country with Jeunesse Club d'Abidjan, Bamba relocated to Bulgaria in September 2008, signing a two-year contract with Chernomorets Burgas. On 13 November 2008, he scored his first goal in Bulgaria in a match against Rodopa Smolyan of Bulgarian Cup.

Lokomotiv Mezdra
In January 2009, Bamba signed a contract with Lokomotiv Mezdra. On March 23, 2009, in a match against Pirin, he made his official debut for the club. In this match, he also scored his first goal for Lokomotiv. On 23 May, Bamba scored three goals against Belasitsa. Thereby, Bamba became the second African player, after Isaac Kuoki, who scored hattrick in a match from Bulgarian top division.

References

External links

Living people
1986 births
Ivorian footballers
Ivorian expatriate footballers
First Professional Football League (Bulgaria) players
JC d'Abidjan players
PFC Chernomorets Burgas players
PFC Lokomotiv Mezdra players
Expatriate footballers in Estonia
Expatriate footballers in Bulgaria
Ivorian expatriate sportspeople in Bulgaria
Footballers from Abidjan
Association football forwards